Joyce Nonde-Simukoko a Zambian politician. She was appointed the Minister of Labour and Social Security in the Cabinet of Zambia by President Edgar Chagwa Lungu on 15 September 2016.

Career
In the past, she served as the president of the Federation of Free Trade Unions of Zambia (FFTUZ). Immediately before her cabinet appointment, she served at the chairperson for Labour and Social Security in the Patriotic Front (Zambia) political party.

Politics
In September 2016, she was appointed minister of Labour and Social Security in the Cabinet of Zambia and nominated as Member of Parliament of Zambia. She took the oath of office on 15 September 2015. She came under pressure to resign in December 2016 after she called for the arrest of a whistle blower Mika Mwambazi who had begun a complaint about alleged mistreatment of workers at Horseshoe, a failing steakhouse in Lusaka. The Human Rights Commission however presented a report that stated that the complaints of worker mistreatment and racism were indeed founded.

References

External links
Website of the National Assembly (Parliament) of Zambia
Photo at Swearing-In Ceremony With President Edgar Lungu on 15 September 2016

Living people
Labour and Social Security ministers of Zambia
Members of the National Assembly of Zambia
University of Zambia alumni
Patriotic Front (Zambia) politicians
Zambian Christians
Women government ministers of Zambia
21st-century Zambian women politicians
21st-century Zambian politicians
Year of birth missing (living people)